Parliamentary elections were held in Moldova on 24 February 2019 in order to elect the 101 members of the Parliament of Moldova. The Constitution holds that elections are to be held no later than four years and three months from the date of inauguration of the previous legislature. The elections were held under a parallel voting system, replacing the closed-list proportional system used in Moldova at all previous parliamentary elections since the independence. The electoral campaign period began in November 2018 and continued up until the election day. Candidates from four parties were elected to the Parliament, more specifically the Party of Socialists of the Republic of Moldova (PSRM), the Democratic Party of Moldova (PDM), the ACUM electoral alliance composed of the DA and the PAS, and the Șor Party. The Party of Communists (PCRM) failed to obtain any seats for the first time since the independence of the Republic of Moldova. The results were subsequently confirmed and validated by Moldova's Constitutional Court on 9 March 2019. Furthermore, the results triggered a constitutional crisis in June.

Electoral system
The 101 seats in the Parliament were elected using a parallel voting system introduced in 2017; 50 MPs were elected by proportional representation in a single nationwide constituency, with the other 51 elected from single-member constituencies.

For the nationwide constituency, the electoral threshold varies depending on the type of list; for single parties or organisations it was 6%; for alliances of two parties it was 9%, and for alliances of three or more parties it was 11%. For independent candidates the threshold was 2%. Turnout must be at least 33% to validate the results. There is still controversy against the new election system and a referendum in 2018 against it was considered possible.

Parties

Opinion polls

Graphical summary

Poll results are listed in the table below in reverse chronological order, showing the most recent first, and using the date the survey's fieldwork was done, as opposed to the date of publication. If such date is unknown, the date of publication is given instead. The highest percentage figure in each polling survey is displayed in bold, and the background shaded in the leading party's colour. In the instance that there is a tie, then no figure is shaded. The "Lead" column on the right shows the percentage-point difference between the two parties with the highest figures. When a specific poll does not show a data figure for a party, the party's cell corresponding to that poll is shown empty. The threshold for a party to elect members is 6%.

Results

Voter turnout

Coalition talks 
Following the elections, both the Socialist Party and Democratic Party proposed forming a coalition with ACUM, with the PDM also proposing that the post of Prime Minister would go to an ACUM member, despite PDM being the larger party. However, following the promises made during the campaign, ACUM refused both offers.

On 8 April, ACUM announced that they would reverse their decision about rejecting coalition negotiations with PSRM.

After the decision, party leaders, Maia Sandu and Andrei Năstase of ACUM, officially invited PSRM to start coalition negotiations. Maia Sandu and Andrei Năstase said that they still rejected coalition negotiations with PDM, but they were willing to negotiate a deal with PSRM.

Coalition negotiations are set to take place on 9 April or on a different day, which will be discussed by ACUM and PSRM.

Notes

References

Parliament
Moldova
Parliamentary elections in Moldova
Election and referendum articles with incomplete results
Moldova